This list of notable organ transplant donors and recipients includes people who were the first to undergo certain organ transplant procedures or were people who made significant contributions to their chosen field and who have either donated or received an organ transplant at some point in their lives, as confirmed by public information.

Survival statistics
Survival statistics depend greatly on the age of donor, age of recipient, skill of the transplant center, compliance of the recipient, whether the organ came from a living or deceased donor and overall health of the recipient. Median survival rates can be quite misleading, especially for the relatively small sample that is available for these organs. Survival rates improve almost yearly, due to improved techniques and medications. This example is from the United Network of Organ Sharing (UNOS), the USA umbrella organization for transplant centers. Up-to-date data can be obtained from the UNOS website.

Notable first procedures

Notable recipients

Multiple Organ Transplant

Corneal transplant

Heart transplants
See also :Category:Heart transplant recipients

Kidney transplants
See also :Category:Kidney transplant recipients

Liver transplants
See also :Category:Liver transplant recipients

Lung transplants
See also :Category:Lung transplant recipients

Notable donors

References

Organ transplant recipients
Transplant
 

Organ transplantation